Joseph Gerard Kopicki (born 12 June 1960) is a former American basketball player.

Biography
Kopicki played basketball at Fitzgerald High School in Warren, Michigan, his hometown.  He was named to the First Team Class A All-State squad and selected as Macomb County Player of the Year in 1978.  During his career at the University of Detroit, Kopicki tallied 1,410 points and 771 rebounds.

Kopicki was drafted in the third round of the 1982 NBA Draft (56th pick overall) by the Atlanta Hawks. However, he was waived by the Hawks on October 19. He signed as a free agent with the Indiana Pacers three days later, but was again waived on October 27 before the start of the  season. After a season with the Wisconsin Flyers of the CBA, he signed with the Washington Bullets on March 9, 1983 and finally played in the NBA. He then started negotiations with the Kansas City Kings, but was convinced by the Denver Nuggets to sign on October 31, 1984, just days into the  season. Kopicki replaced Russell Cross, who had a weak left knee, on the Nuggets roster. His playing time increased when Bill Hanzlik suffered an injury. After the season, he then decided to play in Europe, where he spent the rest of his career on teams in Italy and Spain. In Europe he was a seven-time All-Star.

Kopicki is now the head coach of the boys' basketball team at his high school alma mater, Fitzgerald.

Honors
Kopicki's number 34 has since been retired by his high school.  He was inducted into the Detroit Titans Sports Hall of Fame in 2010.  Kopicki received the 2011 Matt Dobek Special Recognition Award from the National Polish-American Sports Hall of Fame.

Personal
Kopicki has been married to his wife Jennifer since 1986.  They have raised three children, Jessica, Joseph and Matthew.  Kopicki is of Polish descent.

References

External links
Data on Joe Kopicki from ACB
Statistics for Joe Kopicki from Lega Basket

1960 births
Living people
American expatriate basketball people in Italy
American expatriate basketball people in Spain
American men's basketball players
American people of Polish descent
Atlanta Hawks draft picks
Auxilium Pallacanestro Torino players
Basketball players from Michigan
Denver Nuggets players
Detroit Mercy Titans men's basketball players
High school basketball coaches in the United States
Joventut Badalona players
Liga ACB players
Power forwards (basketball)
Sportspeople from Warren, Michigan
Washington Bullets players
Wisconsin Flyers players